This article lists important figures and events in the public affairs of British Malaya during the year 1939, together with births and deaths of prominent Malayans.

Incumbent political figures

Central level 
 Monarch : King George VI
 Governor of the Straits Settlements and High Commissioner to the Malay States:
 Shenton Whitelegge Thomas
 Secretary of the Federated of Malay States :
 Christopher Dominic Ahearne (until unknown date)
 Hugh Fraser (until unknown date)

State level

Straits Settlements
  Penang :
 Residents-Councillors :  Arthur Mitchell Goodman
  Malacca :
 Residents-Councillors :

Federated Malay States
  Selangor :
 British Resident of Selangor :
 Stanley Wilson Jones (until unknown date)
 G. M. Kidd (from unknown date)
 Sultan of Selangor : Sultan Sir Hishamuddin Alam Shah Al-Haj 
  Negri Sembilan :
 British Resident of Negri Sembilan : 
 Gordon Lupton Ham (until unknown date)
 John Vincent Cowgill (from unknown date)
 Yang di-Pertuan Besar of Negri Sembilan : Tuanku Abdul Rahman ibni Almarhum Tuanku Muhammad 
   Pahang :
 British Resident of Pahang : C. C. Brown
 Sultan of Pahang : Sultan Abu Bakar
  Perak :
 British Resident of Perak :
 G. E. Cater (until unknown date)
 Marcus Rex (from unknown date)
 Sultan of Perak : Sultan Abdul Aziz Al-Mutasim Billah Shah Ibni Almarhum Raja Muda Musa I

Other states
  Perlis :
 Raja of Perlis : Syed Alwi Syed Saffi Jamalullail
  Johore :
 Sultan of Johor : Sultan Ibrahim Al-Masyhur
  Kedah :
 Sultan of Kedah : Abdul Hamid Halim Shah
  Kelantan :
 Sultan of Kelantan : Sultan Ismail Sultan Muhammad IV
  Trengganu :
 Sultan of Trengganu : Sulaiman Badrul Alam Shah

Events 
 13 January – Chung Cheng High School was founded.
 15 January – Establishment of Kluang High School.
 Unknown date – SJK(T) Bandar Mentakab was founded.
 Unknown date – The Malayan Dollar was introduced, replacing the Straits Dollar.
 Unknown date – Construction completed on Istana Bukit Serene, Johor.

Births
 16 January – Mohammed Hanif Omar – 4th Inspector-General of Police (1974-1994)
 26 March – Latifah Omar – Actress (died 2013)
 8 April – Lim Keng Yaik - Politician (died 2012)
 14 April – Razali Ismail – Diplomat
 3 June – Lee Shin Cheng, Malaysian business magnate, investor and philanthropist (died 2019)
 4 June – Abdul Kadir Sheikh Fadzir – Politician
 26 June – Zainuddin Maidin, Malaysian politician (died 2018)
 July – Azman Hashim – Chairman of Arab-Malaysian Bank (AmBank)
 3 July – Rahim Razali – Actor, Director, Producer and Sports Commentator
 21 July – Abdul Hamid Othman – Politician (died 2011)
 23 August – Rejabhad – Cartoonist
 10 October – Zainal Abidin Ahmad - Politician (died 2010)
 5 November – Ismail bin Abbas – Novelist
 13 November – S. Othman Kelantan – National Laureate (died 2008)
 26 November – Abdullah Ahmad Badawi – Politician and former 6th Prime Minister of Malaysia
 17 December – Nik Safiah Karim – Lecturer and grammarian
 Unknown date – Othman Hafsham – Film director
 Unknown date – Redza Piyadasa – Actor, art critic and art historian (died 2007)

Deaths

See also
 1939 
 1938 in Malaya | 1940 in Malaya
 History of Malaysia

References

1930s in British Malaya
Malaya